Domenico "Mimmo" Caso (born 9 May 1954) is an Italian professional football coach and a former player, who played as a midfielder.

Honours

Player

Club
Fiorentina
 Coppa Italia winner: 1974–75.

Internazionale
 Serie A champion: 1979–80.

External links

References

1954 births
Living people
People from Eboli
Italian footballers
Italy international footballers
Serie A players
Serie B players
ACF Fiorentina players
S.S.C. Napoli players
Inter Milan players
A.C. Perugia Calcio players
Torino F.C. players
S.S. Lazio players
Italian football managers
Calcio Foggia 1920 managers
A.C. ChievoVerona managers
U.S. Pistoiese 1921 managers
S.S. Lazio managers
Ternana Calcio managers

Association football midfielders
Sportspeople from the Province of Salerno
Footballers from Campania